Renso Guido Perdoni (born December 10, 1947), nicknamed Rock Perdoni, is an American former football player who was a consensus All-American tackle for the Georgia Tech Yellow Jackets football team. Afterward, Perdoni played professionally for three seasons in the Canadian Football League (CFL).

Early years

Perdoni was born in Italy, near Milan.  Perdoni moved to the United States with his family when he was 6 years old.  He grew up in Wellesley, Massachusetts, where he attended Wellesley High School and played for the Wellesley Raiders high school football team.

College career

Ferrum College

Perdoni initially attended Ferrum College, which was then a two-year junior college, located in Ferrum, Virginia, where he played lineman for the Ferrum Panthers football team from 1967 to 1968.  As a second-year starter in 1968, he was a team captain and standout lineman for the Ferrum Panthers team that won the National Junior College Athletic Association national championship.  He was recognized as the national junior college lineman of the year in 1968.

Georgia Tech

After completing his sophomore year at Ferrum, Perdoni transferred to Georgia Tech in Atlanta, Georgia.  He was a two-year starter at defensive tackle for coach Bud Carson's Georgia Tech Yellow Jackets in 1969 and 1970.  Memorably, in 1969, he had ten-tackle performance in which his pass rush contributed to four interceptions in the Yellow Jackets' 6–0 upset of the Georgia Bulldogs.  He was named a third-team All-American by the Associated Press following his 1969 junior season.

As a senior team captain in 1970, he was a key member of the Yellow Jackets team that compiled a 9–3 record, and had 13 tackles in the Jackets' 17–9 victory over the Texas Tech Red Raiders in the December 1970 Sun Bowl.  Following his senior season, he was a finalist for the first annual Lombardi Award, honoring the best college lineman of the year, and he was recognized as a consensus first-team All-American in 1970, when he received first-team honors from the Associated Press (AP), the America Football Coaches Association (AFCA), Central Press Association (CPA), the Football Writers Association of America (FWAA), United Press International (UPI), Football News, The Sporting News and the Walter Camp Foundation.

Perdoni was inducted into the Georgia Tech Sports Hall of Fame in 1979.  As of 2013, he still ranks among the top ten Georgia Tech linemen for career tackles, with 210.

Professional career

After his college career, he signed with the Winnipeg Blue Bombers of the Canadian Football League, and he played the defensive tackle position for the Blue Bombers and Hamilton Tiger-Cats during the  season. During his three-season CFL career, Perdoni played in 32 regular season games.

See also 

 Georgia Tech Yellow Jackets
 List of Georgia Tech alumni

References 

1947 births
Living people
All-American college football players
American football defensive tackles
American people of Italian descent
American players of Canadian football
Canadian football defensive linemen
Edmonton Elks players
Ferrum Panthers football players
Georgia Tech Yellow Jackets football players
Hamilton Tiger-Cats players
Saskatchewan Roughriders players
Winnipeg Blue Bombers players
Players of American football from Massachusetts
Wellesley High School alumni